Onocolus is a genus of South American crab spiders first described by Eugène Simon in 1895. It is considered a senior synonym of Paronocolus.

Species
, it contains seventeen species:
Onocolus comprises the following species:
Onocolus ankeri (Teixeira & Machado, 2019) — Colombia, Brazil
Onocolus biocellatus Mello-Leitão, 1948 — Guyana
Onocolus compactilis Simon, 1895 — Peru, Brazil
Onocolus echinatus (Taczanowski, 1872) — Venezuela to Brazil
Onocolus echinicaudus Mello-Leitão, 1929 — Brazil, Paraguay
Onocolus echinurus Mello-Leitão, 1929 — Brazil
Onocolus eloaeus Lise, 1980 — Brazil
Onocolus garruchus Lise, 1979 — Brazil
Onocolus granulosus Mello-Leitão, 1929 — Peru, Brazil
Onocolus infelix Mello-Leitão, 1941 — Brazil
Onocolus intermedius (Mello-Leitão, 1929) — Brazil, Paraguay
Onocolus latiductus Lise, 1980 — South America
Onocolus mitralis Lise, 1979 — Venezuela, Brazil
Onocolus pentagonus (Keyserling, 1880) — Panama to Brazil
Onocolus perditus Mello-Leitão, 1929 — Brazil
Onocolus simoni Mello-Leitão, 1915 — Brazil, Peru
Onocolus trifolius Mello-Leitão, 1929 — Brazil

References

Thomisidae
Araneomorphae genera
Spiders of South America